Project 22160 is a series of large patrol ships being constructed for the Russian Navy. The vessels are primarily intended for duties such as patrol, monitoring and protection in open and closed seas. The first ship was laid down in February 2014 and joined the Russian Navy in December 2018. By January 2018, six ships were under construction.

Design
The class's armament includes the Kalibr-NK cruise missile, aerosol camouflage, two grenade launchers and two machine guns and a 76.2 mm dual-purpose gun (AK-176). The ship also has a helicopter deck and hangar for one Ka-27 or Ka-226 helicopter. The ship also carries a landing speedboat, and has provisions for drones, underwater unmanned craft and unmanned boats. There is accommodation for an additional 60 men.

In 2020 it was announced that the Russian Navy would begin trials to test the installation of module containers on patrol vessels permitting such ships to  carry significantly upgraded armaments tailored to different missions. The containers were envisaged to carry various weapons including sonars and torpedoes or anti-ship and cruise missiles. The trials took place in the Arctic Sea from June 2020 and lasted two months.

The Russian Navy planned to order 6 additional ships since 2014, however these plans were abandoned in June 2022 after dissatisfaction with the ships' performance during the Russian invasion of Ukraine. Flaws include insufficient seaworthiness, light armour, and a lack of adequate air defences. Notably, after the sinking of the Moskva, the Russian Navy began attaching Tor-M2 km missile systems onto the helicopter decks of the patrol ships.

On 17 August 2022, Ak Bars CEO Renat Mistakhov stated that further vessels can be constructed, which will be armed with new anti-aircraft missiles.

Operational history
On 15 January 2021, Dmitry Rogachev entered the Mediterranean Sea, to strengthen the Russian Navy squadron.

The ship Vasily Bykov participated in the attack on Snake Island on 24 February 2022 during the first day of the 2022 Russian invasion of Ukraine together with the Russian cruiser Moskva. This confrontation ended in the Russian takeover of Snake Island.

On 7 March 2022, Ukrainian sources claimed that the Armed Forces of Ukraine had hit the Vasily Bykov with rocket artillery off the coast of Odessa, reportedly heavily damaging or sinking it. However, on 16 March 2022, Vasily Bykov was seen entering Sevastopol with no damage visible.

On 5 August 2022, one of the ships of the class was seen entering Sevastopol with fire damage to the stern, thought by an open-source intelligence analyst to be the result of an attack on the day before.

Export
In April 2018, it was reported that negotiations are underway after Algeria showed interest in acquiring four project 22160 patrol ships, equipped with the Club-N missile system and the Palma anti-aircraft system which includes the Sosna guided missiles. The demand for ships armed with the Kalibr cruise missiles grew after Russia's use of these missiles in combat in Syria.

Ships
Italics indicate estimates.

See also
List of ships of the Soviet Navy
List of ships of Russia by project number
Okean-class patrol ship
Rubin-class patrol boat

References

Patrol vessels of the Russian Navy
2018 introductions
Patrol ship classes